The Koeye Range is a small mountain range in southwestern British Columbia, Canada, located between the Koeye River and Elizabeth Lake.

See also
List of mountain ranges

References

Pacific Ranges